Anthony Irl "Amos" Martin (born January 30, 1949) is a former professional American football linebacker in the National Football League. He played six seasons for the Minnesota Vikings and the Seattle Seahawks.

1949 births
Living people
American football linebackers
Louisville Cardinals football players
Minnesota Vikings players
Players of American football from Indianapolis
Seattle Seahawks players